This is a List of ambassadors of Venezuela to Spain.

References

 
Venezuela
Spain